Habermann is a surname of German origin. Notable people with the surname include:
Eugen Habermann (1884–1944), Estonian architect
Eva Habermann (born 1976), German film and television actress
Johann Habermann (1516–1590), German Lutheran theologian
Michael Habermann (born 1950), American pianist, professor of music, and author
Nico Habermann (1932–1993), Dutch-American computer scientist
Sven Habermann (born 1961), German-Canadian Olympic soccer player

See also 
Habermann (film), a 2010 German-Czech film

German-language surnames
Occupational surnames